The Hereford and Worcester Fire and Rescue Service (HWFRS) is the statutory fire and rescue service covering Herefordshire and Worcestershire in the West Midlands region of England.

The service was created in 1974 when The County Of Hereford Fire Brigade and The Worcester City & County Fire Brigade were merged to create The County Of Hereford and Worcester Fire Brigade. The two counties were split up again in 1998 but the fire service remained, and is now run by a joint fire authority.

Operations
The service's Chief Fire Officer is Jonathon Pryce, replacing Nathan Travis, who retired in March 2021.

In October 2019, HWFRS entered into a formal alliance with neighbouring Shropshire Fire and Rescue Service. The alliance covers procurement, following previous cooperation on computer systems, fire control and risk management. In June 2020, the two services announced that they were considering a single fire control centre. 

HWFRS has 332 wholetime operational staff, 369 retained (part-time) staff, 21 Fire Control staff, as well as about 98 non-uniformed support staff. The busiest areas of Hereford and Worcester fire and rescue is Worcester and Wyre Forest both averaging roughly 1,500 callouts a year, the least busiest areas being Peterchurch and Fownhope averaging 1020 callouts a year. Evesham, Peterchurch & Wyre Forest stations are also home to the fire services realistic training facilities. Retained firefighters from Herefordshire train at Peterchurch Fire Station and The main training centre is at Droitwich fire station, and more complex training is undertaken at the Fire Service College in Moreton In Marsh. The smallest station in the area is Broadway, which is a small garage sitting off a narrow lane. The largest station is Wyre Forest. It is also home to four pumps and six more vehicles, including a Command Unit and Drone team

Neighbouring fire services include: Gloucestershire, Warwickshire, Shropshire, Staffordshire, Mid and West Wales, South Wales and the West Midlands.

Performance
In 2018/2019, every fire and rescue service in England and Wales was subjected to a statutory inspection by Her Majesty's Inspectorate of Constabulary and Fire & Rescue Services (HIMCFRS). Another cycle of inspections was carried out starting in 2021.The inspections investigate how well the service performs in each of three areas. On a scale of outstanding, good, requires improvement and inadequate, Herefordshire Fire and Rescue Service was rated as follows:

Fire stations

HWFRS splits its fire stations into three districts  North and South, both of which are located in Worcestershire, and West in Herefordshire.

Each fire station is crewed using one of three duty systems, or a combination:
Wholetime  five fire stations are crewed 24 hours a day, seven days a week by full-time firefighters, working on a variety of shift patterns of two nine-hour day shifts and two 15-hour night shifts followed by four days off.
Retained  the majority of fire stations use retained firefighters, who are on call and live or work within five minutes of the station.
Day-crewed  three day-crewed stations are crewed for 12hours a day by full-time firefighters working on a shift pattern of four 12-hour shifts (07:0019:00) then four days off. The fire station is crewed by the retained firefighters at night

, there were 228 wholetime and 379 retained firefighters across the 25 fire stations.

See also
List of British firefighters killed in the line of duty

References

External links

 
Hereford and Worcester Fire and Rescue Service at HMICFRS

Organisations based in Herefordshire
Organisations based in Worcestershire
Hereford and Worcester
Fire and rescue services of England